Andrzej Zaucha may refer to:

 Andrzej Zaucha (reporter) (born 1967), Polish journalist and writer
 Andrzej Zaucha (singer) (1949–1991), Polish singer and actor